Marin Orlinov (born 30 October 1994) is a Bulgarian professional footballer who plays as a goalkeeper for Litex Lovech.

He was a Bulgaria youth international, winning caps at under-21 level.

Career 
A product of the Litex Lovech Academy, Orlinov has spent time on loan with Chavdar Etropole and Spartak Pleven, before joining the latter permanently in 2016. 

In June 2017 Orlinov joined Botev Galabovo and spent with them the first half of the 2017–18 season. In December 2017 he signed with Montana.

References

External links

1994 births
Living people
Bulgarian footballers
First Professional Football League (Bulgaria) players
Second Professional Football League (Bulgaria) players
PFC Litex Lovech players
FC Chavdar Etropole players
PFC Spartak Pleven players
FC Botev Galabovo players
FC Montana players
Association football goalkeepers

bg:Марин Орлинов